International Day for Disaster Risk Reduction (IDDRR) is an international day that encourages every citizen and government to take part in building more disaster-resilient communities and nations. The United Nations General Assembly designated October 13 as International Day for Natural Disaster Reduction as part of its proclamation of International Decade for Natural Disaster Reduction.

In 2002, by a further resolution, the General Assembly decided to maintain the annual observance as a vehicle to promote a global culture of natural disaster reduction, including prevention, mitigation, and preparedness.

In 2009, the UN General Assembly decided to designate October 13 as the official date for this day, and also changed the name to International Day for Disaster Reduction. The word risk was added to the name later.

See also
 World Conference on Disaster Risk Reduction

References

External links
 Official website
 Official website of the United Nations Office for Disaster Risk Reduction

Disaster Reduction, International Day for
Disaster Reduction, International Day for
October observances
Disaster management